Little Big Mouth is a South African romantic comedy film directed and written by Gray and Ziggy Hofmeyr and co-written by Louw Venter. It premiered on Netflix on 22 October 2021.

Cast
 Nay Maps as Siya
 Amanda du-Pont as Mel
 James Borthwick as Frank
 Brady Hofmeyr as Luke
 Charlie Bouguenon as Ceddie
 Georgia-Ann Alp as Alice
 Gray Hofmeyr as Oom Bremmer
 Elzabé Zietsman as Tannie Agnes
 Asgar Mahomed as Ice Cream Shop Owner

Production
An initial alternate title for the film was The Trouble with Siya. Father-and-son duo Gray and Ziggy Hofmeyr directed the film. They also wrote the script with Louw Venter. The film was produced by Menzi Thabede of Thabede Menzi Films, executive produced by Asgar Mahomed, and line produced by Andea de Jager. Principal photography began in March 2021 and wrapped in April.

Release
At the end of September 2021, it was confirmed Little Big Mouth would be part of Netflix's upcoming October slate. The poster was revealed on 8 October followed by a trailer on 15 October.

References

External links

2021 romantic comedy films
English-language Netflix original films
English-language South African films
South African romantic comedy films
2020s English-language films